Edward Norman may refer to:

Edward Norman (historian) (born 1938), English ecclesiastical historian
Edward Norman (bishop) (1916–1987), Bishop of Wellington, 1973–1987
Jim Ed Norman (born 1948), American musician, producer, and executive
Edward Dudley Norman (1910–1998), Royal Navy and Royal Malayan Navy officer